Constantijn van Daalen (April 7, 1884 in Brielle – September 5, 1931 in Amsterdam) was a Dutch gymnast who competed in the 1908 Summer Olympics. He was part of the Dutch gymnastics team, which finished seventh in the team event. In the individual all-around competition he finished 93rd.

References

External links
 

1884 births
1931 deaths
Dutch male artistic gymnasts
Gymnasts at the 1908 Summer Olympics
Olympic gymnasts of the Netherlands
People from Brielle
Sportspeople from South Holland